Li Jiaxin may refer to:

Michelle Reis (born 1970), Hong Kong actress
Ali Lee (born 1982), Hong Kong actress 
Lee Chia-hsin (born 1997), Taiwanese badminton player